Vidale is a surname. Notable people with the surname include:

John Vidale (born 1959), American seismologist
Thea Vidale (born 1956), American comedian and actress

See also
Vidales
Vidali
Vitale